This is a list of notable organizations that provide services or work on issues related to homelessness.

A–B 
 100,000 Homes Campaign, a US program with the mission of placing 100,000 chronically homeless people in stable housing.
 Abahlali baseMjondolo, a popular, entirely non-professionalized and democratic mass movement of shack dwellers and other poor people in South Africa
 Acting for Life
 Ali Forney Center
 Abundant Grace Coastside Worker
 Anti-Poverty Committee, an organisation based in Vancouver, British Columbia, that campaigns against poverty and homelessness
 Association of Gospel Rescue Missions
 Back on My Feet, an American urban homeless outreach organization based in Philadelphia, Pennsylvania, centered on overcoming homelessness through running
 Barefoot Foundation
 Barnabus Manchester
 The Big Issue Foundation
 Bill Wilson Center
 The Booth Centre
 Breaking Ground
Top of page

C–D 

 Caretakers Cottage
 Carrfour Supportive Housing, established in 1993 to end homelessness in Miami, Florida
 Casa Alianza, a charity and NGO whose aims are the rehabilitation and the defence of street children in Guatemala, Honduras, Mexico, and Nicaragua
 Catching Lives
 Catharsis (organization)
 Catholic Charities
 Centrepoint (charity)
 Church penitentiary
 Citizens for Public Justice
 Coalition on Homelessness, a homeless advocacy and social justice organization that focuses on creating long-term solutions to homelessness, poverty, and housing issues in San Francisco, California
 Coast Shelter
 Common Ground (Seattle)
 Community of Sant'Egidio
 Compass Family Services
 Covenant House
 Crisis (charity)
 Dans la Rue
 Detour House
 Dignity Village
 Dome Village
 Downtown Emergency Service Center
Top of page

E–F 
 Emmaus (charity)
 Empowerment Plan
 Empty Homes Agency
 Episcopal Community Services of San Francisco
 Family Promise
 FareStart
 FEANTSA, the only major European network that focuses exclusively on homelessness at European level and receives financial support from the European Commission for the implementation of its activities
 First Step Back Home
 Florence House
 Freight Train Riders of America
 Frontline Foundation
Top of page

G–I 
 HabiJax
 Habitat for Humanity
 HomeAid
 HomeGround Services
 Homeless Workers' Movement, an urban social movement that fights for low-income housing rights in Brazil
 Homes for the Homeless
 Homes Not Jails
 HOPE Atlanta
 Horizon House
 Hospitality House
 Hotel de Gink
 Housing Consortium of the East Bay
 Housing Justice
 Huckleberry House
 I Have A Name Project
 Interagency Council on Homelessness, a US federal program and office created by the McKinney-Vento Homeless Assistance Act of 1986
 International Brotherhood Welfare Association
Top of page

J–L 
 Jesuit Volunteer Corps
 Joe Hill House
 The Jon Bon Jovi Soul Foundation
 Karluk Manor
 LAMP Community
 Lighthouse Wien
 Long Beach Rescue Mission
Top of page

M-N 
 Mad Housers
 Manila Reception and Action Center
 Midnight Mission :P
 Milwaukee Normal School-Milwaukee Girls' Trade and Technical High School
 Mission Australia
Museum of Homelessness
 Najidah (Australia)
 National Alliance to End Homelessness, a nonprofit organization which promotes measures to end homelessness in the United States
 National Coalition for Homeless Veterans
 The National Law Center on Homelessness and Poverty
 New York City Department of Homeless Services
 Notting Hill Housing Trust
Top of page

O–P 
 Old Brewery Mission
 Operation Safety Net
 Outside In (organization)
 Ozone House
 Pacific Garden Mission
 Palladia (social services organization)
 The Passage (charity)
 Pathways to Housing, a not-for-profit organization whose goal is to provide housing for the mentally-challenged homeless of New York City
 Peachtree-Pine shelter
 Poor People's Alliance
 Poverello Center
 Project Compass
 Project HOME
 Projects for Assistance in Transition from Homelessness
Top of page

Q–R 
 Quarriers
 Raphael House
 Restaurants du Cœur
 Rosewater Limited Liability Company, a homeless advocacy organization founded in Cleveland, Ohio
 Rosie's Place, a sanctuary for poor and homeless women located in Boston, Massachusetts
 Rough Sleepers Initiative
 Rowton Houses
 Ruth Ellis Center
Top of page

S 
 Safe Horizon
 Saint Francis House, a daytime shelter for the homeless and poor in downtown Boston, Massachusetts
 Saint Joseph's House of Hospitality (Pittsburgh)
 Salvation Army
 SAMU Social, a municipal emergency service in several cities in France whose purpose is to provide care and medical aid to homeless people
 San Antonio Housing Authority
 Sanyukai, an NGO operating in the San'ya district in Tokyo, Japan which offers free services to the homeless
 The Scott Mission
 Seaton House
 Seattle Youth Garden Works
 Second Harvest Toronto
 Second Presbyterian Church (Chattanooga, Tennessee)
 Self-Master Colony
 Shelter (charity), a registered charity that campaigns to end homelessness and bad housing in England and Scotland
Shelterhouse
 The Shoebox Project for Shelters
 Single Homeless Project
 So Others Might Eat
 The Society for the Relief of the Homeless Poor
 Society of St James
 South Park Inn
 Southern Youth and Family Services
 St Mungo's (charity)
 St Patrick's Church, Hove
 St. Anthony Foundation
 St. Paul's Episcopal Church (Chattanooga, Tennessee)
 StandUp for Kids
 Street Medicine Institute
 Street Outreach Program
 Streetlife (charity)
 Sheltersuit Foundation
 Sulzbacher Center
 Sunday Breakfast Rescue Mission
 Supportive Services for Veteran Families (SSVF)

Top of page

T–U 
 Take Back the Land
 Taldumande Youth Services
 TECHO
 Tent City 4
 Thames Reach
 Tipping Point Community
 Toronto House of Industry
 Transitional Living for Older Homeless Youth
 Union Rescue Mission
 United States Interagency Council on Homelessness
Top of page

W–Z 
 Veterans Aid
 Veterans Transition Center
 Washington Legal Clinic for the Homeless
 Wayside Chapel
 Weingart Center for the Homeless
 Welsh Presbyterian Church (Columbus, Ohio)
 Western Cape Anti-Eviction Campaign, a South African social movement struggling against evictions and other causes of homelessness
 Wild Goose Café
 Wintringham Specialist Aged Care
 Yfoundations
 Youth Off The Streets
 Youthcare Hervey Bay

See also

 List of tent cities in the United States

References

 
Homelessness